Cwm is a village and community in Denbighshire, below the hill Mynydd y Cwm.

The church in Cwm is dedicated to two 6th-century saints, St Mael and St Sulien.

Local councillors have given the go-ahead for a wind turbine to be erected on farmland near Cwm. The 50 kW turbine will be at Marian Mawr and it was voted through with a big majority by Denbighshire County Council.

The community includes the Blue Lion Pub, the settlement of Marian Cwm, and part of Rhuallt.

References 

Villages in Denbighshire